YLMF Computer Technology Co., Ltd. is a computer software company based in Dongguan, Guangdong, China. The company was founded in May 2005, their most significant product to most of the world (including English speaking countries), was the Ubuntu based Linux distribution Ylmf OS.

History 
YLMF was founded in May 2005 with a registered capital of RMB 10 million at Songshan Lake, Dongguan, Guangdong.

Products 
 114la.com
 StartOS
 115.com

References 
http://www.startos.org

External links 
 Official Website (Chinese)
 114 Website Navigation (Chinese)
 Ylmf OS
 915 Mobile Phone Website (Chinese)

Software companies of China
Companies based in Dongguan
Companies established in 2005
Chinese brands